Chorizema is a genus of flowering plants in the family Fabaceae. They are small, evergreen shrubs and climbers native to scrub habitats in Australia, valued in cultivation for their pea-like flowers. Most species do not tolerate frost, and in temperate regions require the protection of glass.

Species list 
The following species and subspecies are accepted by the Australian Plant Census as at June 2020:

 Chorizema aciculare (DC.) C.A.Gardner
 Chorizema aciculare (DC.) C.A.Gardner subsp. aciculare
 Chorizema aciculare subsp. laxum J.M.Taylor & Crisp
 Chorizema carinatum (Meisn.) J.M.Taylor & Crisp
 Chorizema circinale J.M.Taylor & Crisp
 Chorizema cordatum Lindl.
 Chorizema cytisoides Turcz.
 Chorizema dicksonii Graham
 Chorizema diversifolium A.DC.
 Chorizema genistoides (Meisn.) C.A.Gardner
 Chorizema glycinifolium (Sm.) Druce
 Chorizema humile Turcz.
 Chorizema ilicifolium Labill.
 Chorizema nanum (Andrews) Sims
 Chorizema nervosum T.Moore
 Chorizema obtusifolium (Sweet) J.M.Taylor & Crisp
 Chorizema parviflorum Benth.
 Chorizema racemosum (Meisn.) J.M.Taylor & Crisp
 Chorizema reticulatum Meisn.
 Chorizema retorsum J.M.Taylor & Crisp
 Chorizema rhombeum R.Br.
 Chorizema rhynchotropis Meisn.
 Chorizema spathulatum (Meisn.) J.M.Taylor & Crisp
 Chorizema trigonum Turcz.
 Chorizema ulotropis J.M.Taylor & Crisp
 Chorizema uncinatum C.R.P.Andrews
 Chorizema varium Paxton

Hybrids
The following hybrids have been described:
 Chorizema ×lowii Hort. ex Rev.

References

External links
 
 
 Chorizema at Tropicos

Mirbelioids
Fabaceae genera
Fabales of Australia
Rosids of Western Australia